

619001–619100 

|-bgcolor=
| 619001 ||  || — || March 4, 2005 || Mount Lemmon || Mount Lemmon Survey ||  ||  || 
|-id=002 bgcolor=
| 619002 ||  || — || March 10, 2005 || Kitt Peak || Spacewatch ||  ||  || 
|-id=003 bgcolor=
| 619003 ||  || — || September 12, 2002 || Palomar || NEAT ||  ||  || 
|-id=004 bgcolor=
| 619004 ||  || — || March 10, 2005 || Mount Lemmon || Mount Lemmon Survey ||  ||  || 
|-id=005 bgcolor=
| 619005 ||  || — || March 10, 2005 || Mount Lemmon || Mount Lemmon Survey ||  ||  || 
|-id=006 bgcolor=
| 619006 ||  || — || September 10, 2007 || Mount Lemmon || Mount Lemmon Survey ||  ||  || 
|-id=007 bgcolor=
| 619007 ||  || — || March 13, 2005 || Kitt Peak || Spacewatch ||  ||  || 
|-id=008 bgcolor=
| 619008 ||  || — || March 11, 2005 || Mount Lemmon || Mount Lemmon Survey ||  ||  || 
|-id=009 bgcolor=
| 619009 ||  || — || December 4, 2008 || Kitt Peak || Spacewatch ||  ||  || 
|-id=010 bgcolor=
| 619010 ||  || — || March 12, 2005 || Mount Lemmon || Mount Lemmon Survey ||  ||  || 
|-id=011 bgcolor=
| 619011 ||  || — || February 15, 2010 || Catalina || CSS ||  ||  || 
|-id=012 bgcolor=
| 619012 ||  || — || May 3, 2016 || Mount Lemmon || Mount Lemmon Survey ||  ||  || 
|-id=013 bgcolor=
| 619013 ||  || — || May 11, 2015 || Mount Lemmon || Mount Lemmon Survey ||  ||  || 
|-id=014 bgcolor=
| 619014 ||  || — || October 7, 2013 || Mount Lemmon || Mount Lemmon Survey ||  ||  || 
|-id=015 bgcolor=
| 619015 ||  || — || March 14, 2005 || Mount Lemmon || Mount Lemmon Survey ||  ||  || 
|-id=016 bgcolor=
| 619016 ||  || — || March 10, 2005 || Mount Lemmon || Mount Lemmon Survey ||  ||  || 
|-id=017 bgcolor=
| 619017 ||  || — || December 2, 2008 || Mount Lemmon || Mount Lemmon Survey ||  ||  || 
|-id=018 bgcolor=
| 619018 ||  || — || March 13, 2005 || Kitt Peak || Spacewatch ||  ||  || 
|-id=019 bgcolor=
| 619019 ||  || — || March 16, 2005 || Kitt Peak || Spacewatch ||  ||  || 
|-id=020 bgcolor=
| 619020 ||  || — || March 17, 2005 || Kitt Peak || Spacewatch ||  ||  || 
|-id=021 bgcolor=
| 619021 ||  || — || April 6, 2005 || Kitt Peak || Spacewatch ||  ||  || 
|-id=022 bgcolor=
| 619022 ||  || — || March 12, 2005 || Kitt Peak || Spacewatch ||  ||  || 
|-id=023 bgcolor=
| 619023 ||  || — || April 2, 2005 || Mount Lemmon || Mount Lemmon Survey ||  ||  || 
|-id=024 bgcolor=
| 619024 ||  || — || April 2, 2005 || Kitt Peak || Spacewatch ||  ||  || 
|-id=025 bgcolor=
| 619025 ||  || — || March 8, 2005 || Mount Lemmon || Mount Lemmon Survey ||  ||  || 
|-id=026 bgcolor=
| 619026 ||  || — || February 8, 2008 || Kitt Peak || Spacewatch ||  ||  || 
|-id=027 bgcolor=
| 619027 ||  || — || April 11, 2005 || Mount Lemmon || Mount Lemmon Survey ||  ||  || 
|-id=028 bgcolor=
| 619028 ||  || — || April 2, 2005 || Kitt Peak || Spacewatch ||  ||  || 
|-id=029 bgcolor=
| 619029 ||  || — || October 8, 2012 || Haleakala || Pan-STARRS ||  ||  || 
|-id=030 bgcolor=
| 619030 ||  || — || April 6, 2005 || Kitt Peak || Spacewatch ||  ||  || 
|-id=031 bgcolor=
| 619031 ||  || — || April 5, 2005 || Kitt Peak || Spacewatch ||  ||  || 
|-id=032 bgcolor=
| 619032 ||  || — || May 8, 2005 || Kitt Peak || Spacewatch ||  ||  || 
|-id=033 bgcolor=
| 619033 ||  || — || May 6, 2005 || Kitt Peak || Spacewatch ||  ||  || 
|-id=034 bgcolor=
| 619034 ||  || — || May 14, 2005 || Siding Spring || SSS ||  ||  || 
|-id=035 bgcolor=
| 619035 ||  || — || May 13, 2005 || Kitt Peak || Spacewatch ||  ||  || 
|-id=036 bgcolor=
| 619036 ||  || — || October 18, 2012 || Haleakala || Pan-STARRS ||  ||  || 
|-id=037 bgcolor=
| 619037 ||  || — || May 4, 2005 || Mount Lemmon || Mount Lemmon Survey ||  ||  || 
|-id=038 bgcolor=
| 619038 ||  || — || May 8, 2005 || Kitt Peak || Spacewatch ||  ||  || 
|-id=039 bgcolor=
| 619039 ||  || — || May 3, 2005 || Kitt Peak || Spacewatch ||  ||  || 
|-id=040 bgcolor=
| 619040 ||  || — || October 8, 2012 || Kitt Peak || Spacewatch ||  ||  || 
|-id=041 bgcolor=
| 619041 ||  || — || May 10, 2005 || Mount Lemmon || Mount Lemmon Survey ||  ||  || 
|-id=042 bgcolor=
| 619042 ||  || — || May 20, 2005 || Mount Lemmon || Mount Lemmon Survey ||  ||  || 
|-id=043 bgcolor=
| 619043 ||  || — || June 3, 2005 || Kitt Peak || Spacewatch ||  ||  || 
|-id=044 bgcolor=
| 619044 ||  || — || June 8, 2005 || Kitt Peak || Spacewatch ||  ||  || 
|-id=045 bgcolor=
| 619045 ||  || — || April 30, 2005 || Kitt Peak || Spacewatch ||  ||  || 
|-id=046 bgcolor=
| 619046 ||  || — || January 1, 2009 || Mount Lemmon || Mount Lemmon Survey ||  ||  || 
|-id=047 bgcolor=
| 619047 ||  || — || January 29, 2014 || Catalina || CSS ||  ||  || 
|-id=048 bgcolor=
| 619048 ||  || — || June 1, 2005 || Mount Lemmon || Mount Lemmon Survey ||  ||  || 
|-id=049 bgcolor=
| 619049 ||  || — || June 29, 2005 || Kitt Peak || Spacewatch ||  ||  || 
|-id=050 bgcolor=
| 619050 ||  || — || June 30, 2005 || Kitt Peak || Spacewatch ||  ||  || 
|-id=051 bgcolor=
| 619051 ||  || — || July 28, 2008 || Mount Lemmon || Mount Lemmon Survey ||  ||  || 
|-id=052 bgcolor=
| 619052 ||  || — || July 5, 2005 || Mount Lemmon || Mount Lemmon Survey ||  ||  || 
|-id=053 bgcolor=
| 619053 ||  || — || July 5, 2005 || Mount Lemmon || Mount Lemmon Survey ||  ||  || 
|-id=054 bgcolor=
| 619054 ||  || — || July 9, 2005 || Kitt Peak || Spacewatch ||  ||  || 
|-id=055 bgcolor=
| 619055 ||  || — || July 3, 2005 || Mount Lemmon || Mount Lemmon Survey ||  ||  || 
|-id=056 bgcolor=
| 619056 ||  || — || July 9, 2005 || Kitt Peak || Spacewatch ||  ||  || 
|-id=057 bgcolor=
| 619057 ||  || — || June 13, 2005 || Mount Lemmon || Mount Lemmon Survey ||  ||  || 
|-id=058 bgcolor=
| 619058 ||  || — || July 6, 2005 || Kitt Peak || Spacewatch ||  ||  || 
|-id=059 bgcolor=
| 619059 ||  || — || July 7, 2005 || Kitt Peak || Spacewatch ||  ||  || 
|-id=060 bgcolor=
| 619060 ||  || — || July 7, 2005 || Mauna Kea || Mauna Kea Obs. ||  ||  || 
|-id=061 bgcolor=
| 619061 ||  || — || July 7, 2005 || Mauna Kea || Mauna Kea Obs. ||  ||  || 
|-id=062 bgcolor=
| 619062 ||  || — || June 14, 2005 || Mount Lemmon || Mount Lemmon Survey ||  ||  || 
|-id=063 bgcolor=
| 619063 ||  || — || July 7, 2005 || Mauna Kea || Mauna Kea Obs. ||  ||  || 
|-id=064 bgcolor=
| 619064 ||  || — || July 12, 2005 || Mount Lemmon || Mount Lemmon Survey ||  ||  || 
|-id=065 bgcolor=
| 619065 ||  || — || January 30, 2008 || Mount Lemmon || Mount Lemmon Survey ||  ||  || 
|-id=066 bgcolor=
| 619066 ||  || — || July 1, 2014 || Mount Lemmon || Mount Lemmon Survey ||  ||  || 
|-id=067 bgcolor=
| 619067 ||  || — || December 13, 2014 || Haleakala || Pan-STARRS ||  ||  || 
|-id=068 bgcolor=
| 619068 ||  || — || July 3, 2016 || Mount Lemmon || Mount Lemmon Survey ||  ||  || 
|-id=069 bgcolor=
| 619069 ||  || — || July 6, 2016 || Haleakala || Pan-STARRS ||  ||  || 
|-id=070 bgcolor=
| 619070 ||  || — || November 6, 2010 || Mount Lemmon || Mount Lemmon Survey ||  ||  || 
|-id=071 bgcolor=
| 619071 ||  || — || July 28, 2005 || Palomar || NEAT ||  ||  || 
|-id=072 bgcolor=
| 619072 ||  || — || February 23, 2011 || Kitt Peak || Spacewatch ||  ||  || 
|-id=073 bgcolor=
| 619073 ||  || — || July 30, 2005 || Palomar || NEAT ||  ||  || 
|-id=074 bgcolor=
| 619074 ||  || — || August 5, 2005 || Palomar || NEAT ||  ||  || 
|-id=075 bgcolor=
| 619075 ||  || — || June 20, 2015 || Haleakala || Pan-STARRS ||  ||  || 
|-id=076 bgcolor=
| 619076 ||  || — || September 25, 2014 || Mount Lemmon || Mount Lemmon Survey ||  ||  || 
|-id=077 bgcolor=
| 619077 ||  || — || July 31, 2005 || Palomar || NEAT ||  ||  || 
|-id=078 bgcolor=
| 619078 ||  || — || July 29, 2005 || Palomar || NEAT ||  ||  || 
|-id=079 bgcolor=
| 619079 ||  || — || August 25, 2005 || Palomar || NEAT ||  ||  || 
|-id=080 bgcolor=
| 619080 ||  || — || August 28, 2005 || Anderson Mesa || LONEOS ||  ||  || 
|-id=081 bgcolor=
| 619081 ||  || — || August 28, 2005 || Kitt Peak || Spacewatch ||  ||  || 
|-id=082 bgcolor=
| 619082 ||  || — || August 26, 2005 || Palomar || NEAT ||  ||  || 
|-id=083 bgcolor=
| 619083 ||  || — || August 29, 2005 || Anderson Mesa || LONEOS ||  ||  || 
|-id=084 bgcolor=
| 619084 ||  || — || August 31, 2005 || Kitt Peak || Spacewatch ||  ||  || 
|-id=085 bgcolor=
| 619085 ||  || — || August 31, 2005 || Kitt Peak || Spacewatch ||  ||  || 
|-id=086 bgcolor=
| 619086 ||  || — || August 30, 2005 || Kitt Peak || Spacewatch ||  ||  || 
|-id=087 bgcolor=
| 619087 ||  || — || August 28, 2005 || Kitt Peak || Spacewatch ||  ||  || 
|-id=088 bgcolor=
| 619088 ||  || — || August 31, 2005 || Socorro || LINEAR ||  ||  || 
|-id=089 bgcolor=
| 619089 ||  || — || August 31, 2005 || Anderson Mesa || LONEOS ||  ||  || 
|-id=090 bgcolor=
| 619090 ||  || — || August 26, 2005 || Anderson Mesa || LONEOS ||  ||  || 
|-id=091 bgcolor=
| 619091 ||  || — || August 27, 2005 || Palomar || NEAT ||  ||  || 
|-id=092 bgcolor=
| 619092 ||  || — || September 26, 2012 || Mount Lemmon || Mount Lemmon Survey ||  ||  || 
|-id=093 bgcolor=
| 619093 ||  || — || February 8, 2008 || Kitt Peak || Spacewatch ||  ||  || 
|-id=094 bgcolor=
| 619094 ||  || — || January 18, 2008 || Kitt Peak || Spacewatch ||  ||  || 
|-id=095 bgcolor=
| 619095 ||  || — || August 27, 2005 || Palomar || NEAT ||  ||  || 
|-id=096 bgcolor=
| 619096 ||  || — || July 27, 2005 || Palomar || NEAT ||  ||  || 
|-id=097 bgcolor=
| 619097 ||  || — || August 27, 2005 || Palomar || NEAT ||  ||  || 
|-id=098 bgcolor=
| 619098 ||  || — || September 3, 2005 || Mauna Kea || Mauna Kea Obs. ||  ||  || 
|-id=099 bgcolor=
| 619099 ||  || — || October 31, 2006 || Mount Lemmon || Mount Lemmon Survey ||  ||  || 
|-id=100 bgcolor=
| 619100 ||  || — || September 13, 2005 || Catalina || CSS ||  ||  || 
|}

619101–619200 

|-bgcolor=
| 619101 ||  || — || September 1, 2005 || Palomar || NEAT ||  ||  || 
|-id=102 bgcolor=
| 619102 ||  || — || September 13, 2005 || Kitt Peak || Spacewatch ||  ||  || 
|-id=103 bgcolor=
| 619103 ||  || — || September 4, 2011 || Haleakala || Pan-STARRS ||  ||  || 
|-id=104 bgcolor=
| 619104 ||  || — || September 13, 2005 || Kitt Peak || Spacewatch ||  ||  || 
|-id=105 bgcolor=
| 619105 ||  || — || November 17, 2014 || Haleakala || Pan-STARRS ||  ||  || 
|-id=106 bgcolor=
| 619106 ||  || — || September 22, 2005 || Palomar || NEAT ||  ||  || 
|-id=107 bgcolor=
| 619107 ||  || — || September 26, 2005 || Calvin-Rehoboth || L. A. Molnar ||  ||  || 
|-id=108 bgcolor=
| 619108 ||  || — || September 24, 2005 || Kitt Peak || Spacewatch ||  ||  || 
|-id=109 bgcolor=
| 619109 ||  || — || September 29, 2005 || Anderson Mesa || LONEOS ||  ||  || 
|-id=110 bgcolor=
| 619110 ||  || — || March 23, 2003 || Kitt Peak || Spacewatch ||  ||  || 
|-id=111 bgcolor=
| 619111 ||  || — || August 31, 2005 || Palomar || NEAT ||  ||  || 
|-id=112 bgcolor=
| 619112 ||  || — || September 26, 2005 || Kitt Peak || Spacewatch ||  ||  || 
|-id=113 bgcolor=
| 619113 ||  || — || September 27, 2005 || Kitt Peak || Spacewatch ||  ||  || 
|-id=114 bgcolor=
| 619114 ||  || — || September 29, 2005 || Kitt Peak || Spacewatch ||  ||  || 
|-id=115 bgcolor=
| 619115 ||  || — || March 23, 1995 || Kitt Peak || Spacewatch ||  ||  || 
|-id=116 bgcolor=
| 619116 ||  || — || November 7, 2002 || Kitt Peak || Kitt Peak Obs. ||  ||  || 
|-id=117 bgcolor=
| 619117 ||  || — || September 30, 2005 || Kitt Peak || Spacewatch ||  ||  || 
|-id=118 bgcolor=
| 619118 ||  || — || September 30, 2005 || Mount Lemmon || Mount Lemmon Survey ||  ||  || 
|-id=119 bgcolor=
| 619119 ||  || — || September 30, 2005 || Mount Lemmon || Mount Lemmon Survey ||  ||  || 
|-id=120 bgcolor=
| 619120 ||  || — || August 31, 2005 || Palomar || NEAT ||  ||  || 
|-id=121 bgcolor=
| 619121 ||  || — || September 30, 2005 || Mount Lemmon || Mount Lemmon Survey ||  ||  || 
|-id=122 bgcolor=
| 619122 ||  || — || September 30, 2005 || Mount Lemmon || Mount Lemmon Survey ||  ||  || 
|-id=123 bgcolor=
| 619123 ||  || — || September 26, 2005 || Kitt Peak || Spacewatch ||  ||  || 
|-id=124 bgcolor=
| 619124 ||  || — || September 29, 2005 || Kitt Peak || Spacewatch ||  ||  || 
|-id=125 bgcolor=
| 619125 ||  || — || September 30, 2005 || Kitt Peak || Spacewatch ||  ||  || 
|-id=126 bgcolor=
| 619126 ||  || — || September 25, 2005 || Catalina || CSS ||  ||  || 
|-id=127 bgcolor=
| 619127 ||  || — || February 25, 2007 || Kitt Peak || Spacewatch ||  ||  || 
|-id=128 bgcolor=
| 619128 ||  || — || October 1, 2005 || Apache Point || SDSS Collaboration ||  ||  || 
|-id=129 bgcolor=
| 619129 ||  || — || September 30, 2005 || Kitt Peak || Spacewatch ||  ||  || 
|-id=130 bgcolor=
| 619130 ||  || — || September 27, 2005 || Palomar || NEAT ||  ||  || 
|-id=131 bgcolor=
| 619131 ||  || — || September 23, 2005 || Kitt Peak || Spacewatch ||  ||  || 
|-id=132 bgcolor=
| 619132 ||  || — || August 29, 2005 || Anderson Mesa || LONEOS ||  ||  || 
|-id=133 bgcolor=
| 619133 ||  || — || September 3, 2005 || Palomar || NEAT ||  ||  || 
|-id=134 bgcolor=
| 619134 ||  || — || September 14, 2005 || Kitt Peak || Spacewatch ||  ||  || 
|-id=135 bgcolor=
| 619135 ||  || — || October 1, 2005 || Mount Lemmon || Mount Lemmon Survey ||  ||  || 
|-id=136 bgcolor=
| 619136 ||  || — || October 1, 2005 || Mount Lemmon || Mount Lemmon Survey ||  ||  || 
|-id=137 bgcolor=
| 619137 ||  || — || October 5, 2005 || Radebeul || M. Fiedler ||  ||  || 
|-id=138 bgcolor=
| 619138 ||  || — || October 1, 2005 || Socorro || LINEAR ||  ||  || 
|-id=139 bgcolor=
| 619139 ||  || — || October 5, 2005 || Mount Lemmon || Mount Lemmon Survey ||  ||  || 
|-id=140 bgcolor=
| 619140 ||  || — || October 5, 2005 || Kitt Peak || Spacewatch ||  ||  || 
|-id=141 bgcolor=
| 619141 ||  || — || September 24, 2005 || Kitt Peak || Spacewatch ||  ||  || 
|-id=142 bgcolor=
| 619142 ||  || — || October 7, 2005 || Kitt Peak || Spacewatch ||  ||  || 
|-id=143 bgcolor=
| 619143 ||  || — || September 19, 1998 || Apache Point || SDSS Collaboration ||  ||  || 
|-id=144 bgcolor=
| 619144 ||  || — || October 7, 2005 || Mount Lemmon || Mount Lemmon Survey ||  ||  || 
|-id=145 bgcolor=
| 619145 ||  || — || September 29, 2005 || Mount Lemmon || Mount Lemmon Survey ||  ||  || 
|-id=146 bgcolor=
| 619146 ||  || — || September 23, 2005 || Kitt Peak || Spacewatch ||  ||  || 
|-id=147 bgcolor=
| 619147 ||  || — || October 9, 2005 || Kitt Peak || Spacewatch ||  ||  || 
|-id=148 bgcolor=
| 619148 ||  || — || October 8, 2005 || Kitt Peak || Spacewatch ||  ||  || 
|-id=149 bgcolor=
| 619149 ||  || — || September 26, 2005 || Kitt Peak || Spacewatch ||  ||  || 
|-id=150 bgcolor=
| 619150 ||  || — || August 30, 2005 || Kitt Peak || Spacewatch ||  ||  || 
|}

References

External links 
 Discovery Circumstances: Numbered Minor Planets (615001)–(620000) (IAU Minor Planet Center)

0619